Joséphine Catapano (December 29, 1918 – May 14, 2012) was an American perfumer.

Biography 
Joséphine Catapano studied at Hunter High School and Hunter College before starting a career in the perfume industry. In 1953, she created Estée Lauder's first fragrance and perennial best-seller, Youth Dew, a bath oil that also functioned as a perfume.

Catapano is cited as a mentor and influence to Sophia Grosjman. She worked as an executive at International Flavors and Fragrances.

Awards and recognition 
Catapano received the Cosmetic Career Women's Award in 1980. In 1993, Catapano received the Lifetime Achievement Award by the American Society of Perfumers.

Creations 
 Norell Norell
 Estee Lauder Youth Dew
 Estee Lauder JHL
 Guy Laroche Fidji
 Shiseido Zen

Personal life 
She died on May 14, 2012.

References

External References 
 Edwards, Michael. Perfume Legends: French Feminine Fragrances. 1996.

Perfumers
1918 births
2012 deaths